The Waza FC (also known as Detroit Waza) is an American professional arena soccer team based in Metro Detroit competing as a charter member of the Major League Indoor Soccer (MLIS). The team's nickname, "Waza", is both a Japanese word that means "good technique" (技) and a Swahili word meaning "to think clearly".

History
The team was founded in 2008 as Detroit Waza Flo, and were a charter member of PASL-pro, the league that was an offshoot of the Professional Arena Soccer League (PASL) and would eventually be rechristened the MASL in 2014.  The team had 3 homes during its 7 seasons in the Detroit area, the last 2 of which were at the Melvindale Ice Arena in suburban Melvindale, Michigan.  In September 2015, the team announced it would play its home matches for the 2015-16 MASL season at the Dort Federal Credit Union Event Center in Flint, Michigan.  As part of the process, the team dropped the "Detroit" from its name and logo, becoming simply Waza Flo; should they receive a welcome reception in Flint, team ownership noted it would consider adding "Flint" to the team's name. The team previously competed in the Major Arena Soccer League 2 (M2).

On October 4, the team was rebranded "Detroit Waza" and joined Major League Indoor Soccer for the 2022 season.

Staff
 Dominic Scicluna - Co-Owner/Captain
 Mario Scicluna - Co-Owner
 Kathy Coyne - General Manager
 Leif Larsen - Director of Operations

Year-by-year

Playoff record

Awards and honors
Division titles:
 2011-12 PASL Eastern Division
 2012-13 PASL Eastern Division

Championships:
 2012-13 U.S. Open Cup

Arenas
 Compuware Arena, Plymouth, Michigan (2008-2009)
 Taylor Sportsplex, Taylor, Michigan (2009-2013)
 Melvindale Ice Arena, Melvindale, Michigan (2013-2015)
 Dort Federal Credit Union Event Center, Flint, Michigan (2015-2016)
 Melvindale Ice Arena, Melvindale, Michigan (2017)
 Detroit City Fieldhouse, Detroit, Michigan 2018-

References

External links

 Waza FC official website
 Go Live Sports Cast (official media partner)

 
2008 establishments in Michigan
Indoor soccer clubs in the United States
Futsal clubs in the United States
Major Arena Soccer League teams
Professional Arena Soccer League teams
Waza Flo
Association football clubs established in 2008
Sports in Plymouth Township, Michigan